Minas de Riotinto (written without any accent mark) is a town and municipality located in the province of Huelva, in the Autonomous Community of Andalusia, southern Spain.

Minas de Riotinto also comprises the neighborhoods known as El Alto de la Mesa and La Dehesa.

See also
 Rio Tinto Group
 Corta Atalaya
 Riotinto Railway

History

References

External links
Minas de Riotinto - Sistema de Información Multiterritorial de Andalucía

Municipalities in the Province of Huelva